Billy Christopher Bingham (born 15 July 1990) is an English professional footballer who plays as a midfielder for Bromley. He made his first senior appearance playing for Dagenham & Redbridge.

Career
Bingham started his career as a youth player at Crystal Palace, starting a two-year scholarship in the summer of 2006. Upon its completion in April 2009, he signed a six-month deal on a non-contractual basis.

Dagenham & Redbridge
In January 2009 when his contract expired, Bingham joined Football League Two side Dagenham & Redbridge on trial. He was immediately loaned out to Isthmian League Premier Division side Sutton United along with Jacob Erskine, making his debut in a 0–0 draw with Canvey Island. His only other appearance for the club came in a 3–2 defeat to Horsham in the Isthmian League Cup. In February 2009, he signed an eighteen-month contract by Dagenham after impressing on trial. He made his professional debut for the Daggers in August 2009, coming on as a last minute substitute for Jon Nurse in a 3–0 home win over Lincoln City. At the start of November 2009 after impressing in his first two appearances for the club, he signed a new two-year contract extension until 2012. Later in the month he signed for Conference Premier side Grays Athletic on a one-month loan. He returned to Dagenham in December having made six appearances in all competitions.

The Daggers were promoted at the end of the campaign beating Rotherham United in the 2010 Football League Two play-off Final, however, he failed to make any more appearances. In the 2010–11 season Bingham again failed to make an impact after suffering a medial ligament injury, only making six appearances as the Daggers were relegated in their maiden season in Football League One. He scored his first senior goal in Dagenham's 2–1 victory over Gillingham in December 2011, scoring an equalising volley. Bingham established himself at the club during the 2011–12 season making 32 appearances despite having a few injury setbacks. His thirty-yard strike in the 1–1 draw with Crawley Town in April 2012 was voted the club's goal of the season and also secured the club's place in League Two. He was rewarded in July 2012 with a new three-year contract. He started the 2012–13 season as a regular. In October, he was brought back into the starting line-up and scored upon his return in a 3–0 win over Wycombe Wanderers. In November 2013, he suffered a medial knee ligament injury in a 1–1 draw with AFC Wimbledon, similar to the injury he picked up on his left knee in 2010. He made his return in February against Rochdale after two months on the sidelines.

Crewe Alexandra
On 6 July 2015 Bingham joined Crewe Alexandra after rejecting offers of a new contract with Dagenham. He scored his first and only goal for Crewe in a 4–3 EFL Cup loss against Blackburn Rovers on 23 August 2016. On 9 May 2017, Crewe announced that Bingham had been released by the club. Crewe manager David Artell noted that he had wanted Bingham to remain at the club but that he "wanted to move closer to home".

Gillingham 
On 18 July 2017 he signed for League One side Gillingham on a two-year deal. He was released by Gillingham at the end of the 2018–19 season.

Bromley 
In May 2019, Bingham signed for National League club Bromley.

Career statistics

Honours
Dagenham & Redbridge
Football League Two play-off winners: 2009–10

Bromley
FA Trophy: 2021–22

References

External links

Billy Bingham at My Football Data

Living people
1990 births
English footballers
Association football defenders
Association football midfielders
English Football League players
National League (English football) players
Isthmian League players
Crystal Palace F.C. players
Dagenham & Redbridge F.C. players
Sutton United F.C. players
Grays Athletic F.C. players
Crewe Alexandra F.C. players
Gillingham F.C. players
Bromley F.C. players